Advanced Placement (AP) German Language and Culture (also known as AP German Language or AP German) is a course and examination provided by the College Board through the Advanced Placement Program. This course  is designed to give high school students the opportunity to receive credit in a college-level German language course. It is generally taken in the fourth year of high school German study.

Exam 
The AP German Language and Culture exam administered around the end of the academic year is split into two parts, a multiple choice section and a free response section, each with equal value in the overall exam score.

Format

Grade distribution
The grade distributions for the AP German Language and Culture exam since 2012 are:

AP German Literature 
The College Board originally offered two AP German exams: AP German Language and AP German Literature. However, in 1983, due to the persistently low number of AP German Literature exam students, the College Board dropped the Literature exam. Since then, they have offered only the AP German Language exam.

References

External links
 German Language and Culture at CollegeBoard.com

German language in the United States
Advanced Placement
German-language education